The Morgan Plus Four is a roadster produced by the British car manufacturer Morgan from 2020. The Plus Four replaces the +4 which was produced intermittently between 1950 and 2020.

Introduction
The Plus Four was to be presented at the Geneva Motor Show in March 2020, but its appearance was canceled due to the COVID-19 pandemic; it was revealed online on 3 March 2020.

Technical characteristics 
The Plus Four is the second model, after the Plus Six, to be developed on the new bonded aluminium platform associated with a wooden frame named "CX-Generation".

References

External links
Morgan Motor Company page

Plus Four
Cars introduced in 2020
Retro-style automobiles
Roadsters